Malthonica is a genus of funnel weavers first described by Eugène Simon in 1898. Many of its species were transferred to Aterigena and Tegenaria in 2010.

Species
 it contains seven species:

Malthonica africana Simon & Fage, 1922 – East Africa
Malthonica daedali Brignoli, 1980 – Greece (Crete)
Malthonica lusitanica Simon, 1898 – Portugal to France
Malthonica minoa (Brignoli, 1976) – Greece (Crete)
Malthonica oceanica Barrientos & Cardoso, 2007 – Portugal
Malthonica paraschiae Brignoli, 1984 – Greece
Malthonica spinipalpis Deltshev, 1990 – Greece

References

External links

Agelenidae
Araneomorphae genera
Spiders of Africa
Taxa named by Eugène Simon